Joyanta Basumatary is an Indian politician and a member of the United People's Party Liberal from Assam.  He is an MLA, elected from the Sidli constituency in the 2021 Assam Legislative Assembly election.

References 

Living people
Year of birth missing (living people)
People from Kokrajhar  district
Assam MLAs 2021–2026